Burgoa is a genus of fungi belonging to the family Cantharellaceae.

The species of this genus are found in Europe and Northern America.

Species:

Burgoa alutacea 
Burgoa angulosa 
Burgoa anomala 
Burgoa hutsonii 
Burgoa moriformis 
Burgoa nigra 
Burgoa pisi 
Burgoa splendens 
Burgoa verzuoliana

References

Cantharellaceae
Agaricomycetes genera